Polina Merenkova (born 11 November 1995) is a  former professional Uzbekistani tennis player.

Merenkova has a career-high doubles ranking of 431 by the Women's Tennis Association (WTA), which she achieved on 17 July 2017. She won four doubles titles on tournaments of the ITF Circuit.

She made her WTA Tour main-draw debut at the 2016 Tashkent Open in the doubles event, partnering Dayana Yastremska.

ITF finals

Doubles (4–2)

References

External links
 
 

1995 births
Living people
Uzbekistani female tennis players
21st-century Uzbekistani women